The 2019–20 Central Arkansas Sugar Bears basketball team represents the University of Central Arkansas during the 2019–20 NCAA Division I women's basketball season. The Sugar Bears are led by eighth year head coach Sandra Rushing and play their home games at the Farris Center. They are members of the Southland Conference.

Roster
Sources:

Schedule
Sources:

|-
!colspan=9 style=| Non-conference regular Schedule

|-
!colspan=9 style=| Southland Conference Schedule

See also
 2019–20 Central Arkansas Bears basketball team

References

Central Arkansas Sugar Bears basketball seasons
Central Arkansas
Central Arkansas Bears basketball team
Central Arkansas Bears basketball team